Deavgay is a mountain located in Dagestan, Russia. At  elevation, it is the highest point of the Kyabyak range of the Greater Caucasus.

Geography 
The mountain belongs to the Samur basin. It is in Rutulsky District, 5 km north of the village Borch and 9 km southwest of the larger village Rutul. Deavgay is Dagestan's eleventh-highest mountain and the 193th-highest in Russia.

References

Mountains of Dagestan
Four-thousanders of the Caucasus